Water basketball is a water sport, which mixes the rules of basketball and water polo, played in a swimming pool. Teams of five players each must shoot at the goal with a ball within a certain time after gaining possession.

History
In the Netherlands, people have been playing water basketball (known there as waterbasketbal) since the 1970s. In the Netherlands it was played by people with a handicap. Besides regular tournaments, they also organize a national championship where the best teams compete for the official Dutch Waterbasketbal championship title.

In Slovenia a version of water basketball developed in 1997. Till that time there were played two versions of water basketball. In first one there was a classical basket fixed at edge of the swimming pool. This was not very convenient because player were kicked on the wall of swimming pool and basket was to high for realization of some attractive actions. The second version was using a floating basket, making it very difficult to throw the ball in the basket.
Tomaž Slavec and Matjaž Kodek from Kranj, Slovenia developed a special basket (long pillar sunk in the water, with basket on the end at one meter over water level), the ball, and made new playing rules.  All disadvantages of the previously described version of water basketball were removed. There is no wall and floating basket problem, the game became very dynamic (as with hockey) because it could be played behind the basket. This game is also played in Hungary. In Pécs since 2003 the PVKK team and in Budapest since 2007 the Budapesti Medúzák team.

In Tasmania, Water Basketball first started in September 2003 with a demonstration game between two teams made up of Hobart Chargers, Hobart Hurricanes, Tassie Devils football team and the Tassie Tigers cricket team. The sport has been further developed by The Hobart Aquatic Centre to allow for a more recreational and mixed approach to the game. It involves two teams of six players (of which at least three are female) on field (with a maximum of four additional substitutes), who pass the ball down the pool to their goal end, which is a hoop similar to basketball.

In 2005, the Italian Federation of Basketball recognized it as a form of basketball.

References

External links 
Water Basketball Tasmania
Water basketball Slovenia
Dutch waterbasketball
Waterbasketball France
Water basketball Slovenia Maribor
Water basketball in Hungary 
Budapesti Medúzák 
Water basketball Italy

Forms of basketball
Water sports
Team sports